Florencio Segundo Barrera Godoy (6 June 1915 – 28 March 1975) was a Chilean footballer as a midfielder. He made ten appearances for the Chile national team from 1942 to 1945. He was also part of Chile's squad for the 1942 South American Championship.

References

External links
 

1915 births
1975 deaths
Chilean footballers
Association football midfielders
Chile international footballers
Deportes Magallanes footballers
Place of birth missing